Semanggi is a common name in Indonesia for two closely related species of aquatic ferns:

In Javanese it can refer to Marsilea crenata
In Indonesian it can refer to Marsilea minuta
Semanggi may also refer to:

 Semanggi shootings, two 1998 incidents
 Semanggi Interchange

Marsilea